The following are international rankings of the Philippines.

General
 Good Country Index 2017: ranked 51 out of 163

Air
 Air Quality Life Index 2020: ranked 70th out of 106 nations

Demographics
 Population: ranked 12 (July 2014 est.)
 Population density: ranked 24 
 Total immigrant population: ranked 101 out of 228 countries (2013 est.)

Economics
 Motor Vehicle Production (OICA): ranked 39 (2013 est.)
 Labor Force: ranked 16 (2013 est.)
 Proved Natural Gas Production: ranked 55 (2008 est.)
 Proved Natural Gas Reserves: ranked 52 (2009 est.)
 Proved Oil Production: ranked 71 (2008 est.)
 Proved Oil Reserves: ranked 62 (2009 est.)
 Electricity Consumption: ranked 44 (2009 est.)
 Electricity Production: ranked 38 (2013 est.)
 Total Renewable Water Resources: ranked 23 (2011 est.)
 Freshwater withdrawal: ranked 28 (2000 est.)
 Land Use: ranked 27 (2005 est.)
 Exclusive Economic Zone Area: ranked 22
 Irrigated Lands: ranked 30 (2003 est.)
 Foreign direct investment (FDI) abroad: ranked 55 (2012 est.)
 Foreign direct investment (FDI) received: ranked 64 (2010 est.)
 Freedom from Corruption: ranked 97 (2013 est.)

Environment
 World Risk Index 2013: ranked 170 out of 172
 Environmental Performance Index 2014: 114 out of 178

Geography
 Total Area: ranked 73
 Length of Coastline: ranked 4
 Longest Coastline (Countries without Land Borders): ranked 1 
 Total Forest Area: ranked 65

Press freedom
 , the Reporters Without Borders Press Freedom Index ranked the Philippines 149th out of 180 countries rated.

Society
 Human Development Index (United Nations): ranked 117 out of 187 countries (2013 est.)
 Suicide Rate: ranked 90 (2005 est.)
 Happy Planet Index 2012: ranked 24 out of 111
 Where-to-be-born Index 2005: (Economist Intelligence Unit): ranked 63 out of 80
 Education Index 2008: ranked 66
 Global Gender Gap Report 2014: (World Economic Forum): ranked 8 out of 136
 Legatum Prosperity Index 2014: ranked 67 out of 142
 Satisfaction with Life Index 2018: ranked 78 out of 178 countries.
Programme for International Student Assessment 2018: ranked 79 out of 79 countries in reading comprehension, 78 out of 79 countries in science, and 78 out of 79 countries in mathematics
Trends in International Mathematics and Science Study 2019: ranked 58 out of 58 countries in mathematics and science proficiency
 Ethnic and cultural diversity level (James Fearon): ranked 137 out of 159 (2003 est.)
 World Giving Index 2014: ranked 30 out of 135rts
 FIBA World Rankings - men (basketball): 28 out of 87 (Oct 2015)
 FIBA World Rankings - women (basketball): 49 out of 75 (Oct 2015)
 FIFA Men's World Rankings (association football): 128 out of 209 (Mar 2015)
 FIFA Women's World Rankings (association football): 80 out of 177 (Dec 2014)
 World Rugby Rankings (rugby union): 52 out of 102 (Mar 2015)
 IBAF World Rankings (baseball): 23 out of 73 (Nov 2014)

Technology
 E-readiness (Economist Intelligence Unit): ranked 55
 Number of Telephones - main lines in use: ranked 43 (2012)
 Number of Mobile Phones: ranked 12 (2012)
 Number of Internet Users: ranked 34 (2009)
 Average Internet connection speed: ranked 49 out of 55 (2014)
 Number of Internet hosts: ranked 52 out of 233 (2012)

Tourism
 World's most visited country (UNWTO): ranked 52 (2008)

Transportation
 Number of Airports: ranked 24 (2013)
 Railways: ranked 88 (2010)
 Roadways: ranked 23 (2009)
 Waterways: ranked 31 (2011)
 Merchant Marine: ranked 23 (2010)

Cities
 Largest Urban Area by Population (Metro Manila): ranked 3 (2015)
 Largest Metropolis by Population (Metro Manila): ranked 11
 Manila (Richest cities, PricewaterhouseCoopers): ranked 40
 Manila (Most expensive cities, Mercer Human Resource Consulting 2008): ranked 126

See also
List of records of the Philippines
List of firsts in the Philippines

References

External links
 Guide to Country Comparisons, CIA World Factbook
 2010 Index of Economic Freedom
 Google Public Data

Philippines